In the Raw is the eighth solo studio album by Finnish soprano vocalist and composer Tarja Turunen. The record was released on 30 August 2019.

Background 
On In the Raw, released on August 30, 2019, composer and vocalist Tarja Turunen joined forces with other Heavy Metal vocalists such as Soilwork vocalist Björn "Speed" Strid, Tommy Karevik of Kamelot, and Lacuna Coil's Cristina Scabbia, thus including in the album vocal collaborations with them. Strid is featured in "Dead Promises", Scabbia's vocals can be heard in "Goodbye Stranger", and Karevik is featured in "Silent Masquerade".

On 12 September 2019, Turunen started the "Raw Tour" to promote the "In the Raw" album. However, many of its shows were postponed due to the COVID-19 pandemic.

Critical reception 
In the Raw has been widely acclaimed by both heavy metal fans and music critics in general, as Gary Hernandez from "Metal Temple" wrote: "In the Raw reminds us how good Symphonic Metal can be: Vocal performances executed to perfection, versatile songwriting, thoughtful arrangements, deeply talented musicians, excellent production values".

Track listing

Personnel 
All information from the album booklet.

Tarja
 Tarja Turunen – lead vocals, piano, art director
 Alex Scholpp – guitars, bass, keyboards, vocals, drum programming
 Christian Kretschmar – keyboards
 Kevin Chown – bass

Additional musicians
 Björn Strid – additional vocals
 Cristina Scabbia – additional vocals
 Tommy Karevik – additional vocals
 Tim Palmer – guitars, keyboards, percussion, narration, mixing
 Timm Schreiner – drums
 Julián Barrett – guitars, drum programming, co-producer (tracks 8 and 10), recording
 Bart Hendrickson – keyboards, programming, drum programming, ambient design
 Doug Wimbish – bass
 Peter Barrett – bass
 Anders Wollbeck – keyboards, programming
 Johnny Andrews – keyboards, co-producer (track 3)
 Erik Nyholm – keyboards
 James Dooley – keyboards, programming
 Carlinhos Brown – percussion
 Thiago Pugas – percussion

Production
 Marcelo Cabuli – art direction, recording
 Travis Kennedy – mixing assistant
 Justin Shturtz – mastering
 Max Vaccaro – executive producer
 Anja Obersteller – executive producer
 Isabelle Albrecht – executive producer
 Bernhard Hahn – recording
 Jim Dooley – ambient design

Charts

References

External links 
 Tarjaturunen.com
 Album: In the Raw
 Tarja: In the Raw

Tarja Turunen albums
2019 albums